The 2022 J3 League, referred to as the  for sponsorship reasons, was the 9th season of J3 League under its current name.

Iwaki FC won the J3 title for the first time in their history,  in their debut campaign at the J3 League, just a year after being promoted from the JFL. They were promoted to the 2023 J2 League alongside Fujieda MYFC, who narrowly promoted with one point off the 3rd-placed team. Both teams won promotion for the J2 League for the first time.

Overview 

After no relegations from the J2 League in 2020, in 2021 there were four relegations and the number of teams in the 2022 J3 League increased from 15 to 18.

This is last season to not feature relegation in 2022. From 2023, relegation from the J3 League to the JFL will be made possible.

Changes from the previous season 

The 4 teams relegated from J2 League in 2021 were: SC Sagamihara, Ehime FC, Giravanz Kitakyushu and Matsumoto Yamaga.

Roasso Kumamoto and Iwate Grulla Morioka were promoted to J2 League.

Iwaki FC was promoted from 2021 JFL as champions of that division. Fukushima team are making their debut in the J3 League after obtaining a J.League License, to enable their promotion from the JFL.

Participating clubs

Personnel and kits

Managerial changes

Foreign players 
From the 2021 season onwards, there is no limitations on signing foreign players, but clubs could only register up to five of them for a single matchday squad. Players from J.League partner nations (Thailand, Vietnam, Myanmar, Malaysia, Cambodia, Singapore, Indonesia, and Qatar) were exempted from these restrictions.

Players name in bold indicates the player is registered during the midseason transfer window.
Player's name in italics indicates the player has Japanese nationality in addition to their FIFA nationality, holds the nationality of a J.League partner nation, or is exempt from being treated as a foreign player due to having been born in Japan and being enrolled in, or having graduated from an approved type of school in the country.

League table

Stadiums 
Primary venues used in the 2022 J3 League season:

Season statistics

Goal contributions

Top scorers

Top assists

Discipline

Player 
Most yellow cards: 8
  Kento Dodate (YSCC Yokohama)

 Most red cards: 1 
  Naoki Sato (Azul Claro Numazu)
  Kenshiro Suzuki (Azul Claro Numazu)
  Takashi Akiyama (Fujieda MYFC)
  Nobuyuki Kawashima (Fujieda MYFC)
  Kazuki Dohana (Fukushima United)
  Takumi Baba (Gainare Tottori)
  Koshiro Itohara (Gainare Tottori)
  Takumi Fujitani (FC Gifu)
  Freire (FC Gifu)
  Marcus Índio (FC Imabari)
  Yuji Kimura (Kagoshima United)
  Frank Romero (Kagoshima United)
  Rei Yonezawa (Kagoshima United)
  Akira Ando (Matsumoto Yamaga)
  Hiroshi Azuma (Nagano Parceiro)
  Hayate Sugii (Nagano Parceiro)
  Ryoma Ishida (SC Sagamihara)
  Shunsuke Ueda (Tegevajaro Miyazaki)
  Masanobu Komaki (Vanraure Hachinohe)
  Kento Dodate (YSCC Yokohama)
  Riku Furuyado (YSCC Yokohama)

Club 
Most yellow cards: 58 (YSCC Yokohama)

Most red cards: 3 (Kagoshima United)

Awards

Monthly awards

References

External links
Official website, JLeague.jp 

J3 League seasons
3
Japan
Japan